MLB Slugfest 2003 is a baseball video game published by Midway Games in 2002. It is the first game in the MLB Slugfest series. Alex Rodriguez from the Texas Rangers is the cover athlete.

Reception

The game received "generally favorable reviews" on all platforms according to the review aggregation website Metacritic. Maxim gave the Xbox version universal acclaim in its early review, nearly three months before said console version was released Stateside. It was nominated for GameSpots annual "Best Alternative Sports Game on GameCube" and "Best Alternative Sports Game on Xbox" awards, but lost both to Tony Hawk's Pro Skater 4.

References

External links
 

2002 video games
Baseball video games
GameCube games
Major League Baseball video games
Midway video games
North America-exclusive video games
PlayStation 2 games
Video games developed in the United States
Video games set in 2003
Xbox games